Bruce Hainley is an American critic, writer and poet. He is the professor of Criticism and Theory at the MFA program at the Art Center College of Design in Pasadena, California, and the Roski School of Fine Arts, University of Southern California. In 2021, he was made Chair of the Department of Visual and Dramatic Arts at Rice University. He is a contributing editor at Artforum and Frieze.

In 2003 he co-wrote Art - A sex Book with filmmaker John Waters. Hainley's 2006 book of poetry, Foul Mouth, was a finalist in the National Poetry Series.

Bibliography
Books
 Vile Days: The Village Voice Art Columns, 1985-1988. By Gary Indiana. Edited by Bruce Hainley. Semiotext(e)/MIT Press. 2018.
 Under the Sign of [sic]. Sturtevant’s Volte-Face. Semiotext(e). 2013. 
 Foul Mouth. Los Angeles: 2nd Cannons Publications. 2006. 
 Art – A Sex Book. John Waters, Bruce Hainley. New York: Thames & Hudson, 2003. 
 Pep Talk Reader. (Edition of 100)]. Bruce Hainley.
Essays
 Tomma Abts. Essays by Jan Verwoert, Bruce Hainley, Laura Hoptman. New York: Phaidon, 2008. 
 Matthew Ronay: Goin' Down, Down, Down. Essays by Michael Glover and Bruce Hainley. Edited by Ziba de Weck Ardalan. Zurich: JRP|Ringier, 2006. 
 Urs Fischer: Kir Royal. Essays by Jörg Heiser, Urs Fischer, and Bruce Hainley. Zurich: JRP|Ringier, 2005. 
 Tom Friedman (Contemporary Artists). Essays by  Bruce Hainley, Dennis Cooper, and Adrian Searle. New York: Phaidon, 2001.

References

External links
 “To Whom it May Concern.” Red Hook Journal, CSS Bard. August 30, 2011. 
 Bruce Hainley, Lisa Lapinski, and Sarah Lehrer-Graiwer discuss Sturtevant at 356 S. Mission Rd. December 7, 2013. (Youtube).

American male poets
Living people
American art critics
Art Center College of Design faculty
Writers from Los Angeles
Poets from California
University of Southern California faculty
American male non-fiction writers
Year of birth missing (living people)